John, Johnny, or Johnnie Dawson may refer to:

Arts and entertainment
John Dawson (actor) (1919–1984), played Mr. Mumford in Rentaghost
John Dawson (musician) (1945–2009), American singer and guitarist with the New Riders of the Purple Sage
John Dawson (anchor) (born 1969), British television journalist

Politics and law
John Dawson (1762–1814), American politician, U.S. Representative from Virginia
John Dawson Jr. (1765–1823), intendant (mayor) of Charleston, South Carolina
John Bennett Dawson (1798–1845), American politician, U.S. Representative from Louisiana
John Littleton Dawson (1813–1870), American politician, U.S. Representative from Pennsylvania
John W. Dawson (1820–1877), American politician, governor of Utah Territory
John A. Dawson (Canadian politician) (1826–1902), member of Canadian House of Commons from Pictou
John Dawson (Australian politician) (fl. 1861), member of the New South Wales Legislative Council
John Shaw Dawson (1869–1960), Justice of the Kansas Supreme Court
John R. Dawson (1950–2003), United States Ambassador to Peru
John Dawson (Illinois politician), candidate in the 2010 United States House of Representatives elections in Illinois

Science and medicine
John Dawson (surgeon) (1734–1820), British mathematician and surgeon
John Frederic Dawson (1802–1870), English entomologist and taxonomist
John William Dawson (1820–1899), Canadian geologist
John Dawson (botanist) (1928–2019), New Zealand botanist
John M. Dawson (1930–2001), American computational physicist
John Leonard Dawson (1932–1999), British physician, Serjeant Surgeon to the Royal Household
John W. Dawson Jr. (born 1944), American mathematician

Sports
John Dawson (cricketer, born 1871) (1871–1948), English cricketer
Johnny Dawson (1902–1986), American amateur golfer
Johnnie Dawson (1914–1984), American Negro leagues baseball player
Peter Dawson (cricketer) (John Peter Dawson, 1946–2012), English cricketer

Others
John Dawson, 1st Earl of Portarlington (1744–1798), Irish peer
John Dawson, 2nd Earl of Portarlington (1781–1845), Irish peer
John Dawson (slave trader) (died 1812), British slave trader
John Barkley Dawson (1830–1918), American rancher, namesake of Dawson, New Mexico
John A. Dawson (geographer), British academic in the fields of geography and marketing

See also
Jack Dawson (disambiguation)